Urethral resistance pressure is the pressure existing in urethra during urination or other conditions generated by the detrusor muscle. It forces urine into and through the urethra in order for micturition. In the urethra, part of that pressure is converted to dynamic (forward) pressure which helps voiding happen. On the other hand, static (lateral) pressure helps preventing involuntary dribbling. Decline in urethral resistance pressure is one of the contributing factors is some forms of incontinence for example stress incontinence as a result of atrophy in menopause.

Decline in urethral resistance pressure is commonly associated with decline in bladder outlet.

Urethral retro-resistance pressure (URP) is a new clinical measure of urethral function measured by a new urodynamic measurement system. URP is the pressure required to achieve and maintain an open sphincter.

References

Urine